Hackney Wick Football Club is a football club in London, England.

History
Bari Football Club was established in 1995 and played in the South Essex Football League until 1998. After leaving, the club joined Division One of the Asian League. In 2011–12 the club won the Essex Corinthian Sunday Football League. They then successfully applied to join the Essex Senior League, adopting the name London Bari. In the club's first season in the league, they finished tenth. The following season saw them finish bottom of the league.

In 2017 the club merged with Middlesex County League club Hackney Wick, which had been founded in 2015 and played at Mabley Green in Hackney. The merged club took the Hackney Wick name and London Bari's place in the Essex Senior League. In 2017–18 they finished bottom of the Essex Senior League and were relegated to the new Division One South of the Eastern Counties League.

Ground
After joining the Essex Senior League, London Bari started groundsharing with Clapton at the Old Spotted Dog Ground. The merged club continued playing at the ground. The club was due to move to the London Marathon Community Track stadium for the 2018–19 season, but ground issues put the move on hold and the club remained at the Old Spotted Dog Ground. In the opening weeks of the 2019–20 season, Hackney Wick, and fellow tenants Clapton, were forced to vacate the Old Spotted Dog due to issues at the ground. Hackney Wick subsequently entered a groundsharing agreement with Haringey Borough at Coles Park. On 23 July 2020, the club announced a groundsharing agreement with Witham Town at Spa Road.

Records
Best FA Cup performance: Preliminary round, 2018–19
Best FA Vase performance: First round, 2016–17
Record attendance: 785 vs Clapton, Essex Senior League, 7 October 2017

References

External links
Official website

Football clubs in London
Football clubs in England
Association football clubs established in 1995
1995 establishments in England
Essex Senior Football League
Eastern Counties Football League
Spartan South Midlands Football League
Sport in the London Borough of Hackney
Hackney Wick
Hackney, London
Middlesex County Football League
Diaspora association football clubs in England